Pepper was a female  Dalmatian dog from Pennsylvania, United States, who disappeared in 1965, eventually to turn up euthanased in a New York hospital, having been stolen by an animal dealer who supplied vivisectionists. Pepper's story, along with a Life magazine article titled "Concentration Camp for Dogs", led to members of the United States Congress and Senate being bombarded with angry letters, the volume of which surpassed briefly those about either Civil Rights and the Vietnam War. This  campaign resulted in lawmakers passing the Animal Welfare Act of 1966.

See also
 Brown Dog affair - similar incident fifty years before in the UK

References

External links
 - first of a five-part article analysing the impact of Pepper

Individual dogs
Animal welfare and rights legislation in the United States